Jorge Leguín Cabezas Hurtado (born 6 September 2003) is a Colombian professional footballer who plays as a centre-forward for Categoría Primera A club Independiente Medellín, on loan from EFL Championship club Watford.

Club career 
Cabezas Hurtado is a product of Real Cartagena's academy: he made his professional debut for the club on 14 April 2021, coming on as a substitute in the second half of the Copa Colombia match against Llaneros, which ended in a 0–0 draw. The striker scored his first senior goal on 27 February 2022, netting the winner in a 1–2 Categoría Primera B victory over Real Santander. Then, on 20 April of the same year, he scored his first brace in a 3–1 league win over Boyacá Chicó.

On 3 October 2022, it was officially announced that Cabezas Hurtado had agreed to join EFL Championship side Watford on a permanent deal, signing a contract that would begin in the summer of 2023 and last until 2029. However, on 19 December of the same year, the transfer's activation was anticipated to January 2023, as the forward was officially set to join Categoría Primera A side Independiente Medellín on a six-month loan, with an option to extend the deal until the end of the 2023 season.

International career 
Cabezas Hurtado has represented Colombia at youth international level, having played for the under-20 national team.

In May 2022, he was included in the Colombian squad that took part in the Maurice Revello Tournament in France, where he scored a goal in the last group stage match against Japan, as the Cafeteros eventually finished in fourth place.

In January 2023, he was included in the Colombian squad for the 2023 South American U-20 Championship, hosted in his own country. Having scored two goals in the final stage of the tournament, as well as one assist, Cabezas Hurtado helped Colombia finish in third place and qualify for the 2023 FIFA U-20 World Cup in Indonesia.

References

External links 

 
 

2003 births
Living people
Colombian footballers
Association football forwards
Watford F.C. players
Independiente Medellín footballers
Colombia youth international footballers
Colombian expatriate footballers
Colombian expatriate sportspeople in England
Expatriate footballers in England